Bohot Nunatak (‘Bohotski Nunatak’ \'bo-hot-ski 'nu-na-tak\) is the rocky hill of elevation 885 m projecting from the ice cap in the northeastern periphery of Sentinel Range in Ellsworth Mountains, Antarctica.  It is named after the settlement of Bohot in Northern Bulgaria.

Location
US mapping in 1961.

Maps
 Newcomer Glacier.  Scale 1:250 000 topographic map.  Reston, Virginia: US Geological Survey, 1961.
 Antarctic Digital Database (ADD). Scale 1:250000 topographic map of Antarctica. Scientific Committee on Antarctic Research (SCAR). Since 1993, regularly updated.

Notes

References
 Bohot Nunatak. SCAR Composite Gazetteer of Antarctica.
 Bulgarian Antarctic Gazetteer. Antarctic Place-names Commission. (details in Bulgarian, basic data in English)

External links
 Bohot Nunatak. Copernix satellite image

Ellsworth Mountains
Bulgaria and the Antarctic
Nunataks of Ellsworth Land